Siderurgistul Galați was a football club based in Galaţi, Galați County, Romania. It was founded in 1955 and dissolved in 1967.

History

In 1955 Dinamo Galați is founded and in 1961 the club was renamed CSO Galați, and one year later renamed again in Siderurgistul, with the following players: Dan, Câmpean, Lupea, Hulea, Stănescu, Dumitru Ionel, Coman I, Oprea, Costache, Militaru, Voicu, I. Gheorghe, Matei, Dărăban, Zagardan, David, Dragomir.

In 1963 Siderurgistul promotes to the Divizia A and qualifies for the Romanian Cup final (1–6 against Petrolul Ploieşti).

At the end of the 1963–64 season the team finishes 14th and relegates, but only to promote once again the following season. Coaches P. Moldoveanu and D. Stanciu obtained this performance using the following players: Florea (Câmpeanu) – R. Tomescu, Costache, Ivănescu (Hulea), Voicu, Constantin (Comșa), Matei (Filimon), Pătrașcu, Voinea, Adam, Stoicescu (David). But this experience is short also, and the club relegates again.

The following season, 1966–67, the club tries to promote for the third time, but finishes 2nd, and gives up its place in the Divizia B and its players go to Politehnica Galaţi, being dissolved.

Chronology of names

Honours

Liga I:
Winners (0):, Best finnish: 14th 1963–64, 1965–66

Liga II:
Winners (2): 1962–63, 1964–65
Runners-up (3): 1959–60, 1960–61, 1966–67

Romanian Cup:
Winners (0):
Runners-up (1): 1962–63

Notable Managers
Ion Zaharia

References

Association football clubs established in 1961
Association football clubs disestablished in 1967
Defunct football clubs in Romania
Liga I clubs
Liga II clubs
Sport in Galați
1961 establishments in Romania
1967 disestablishments in Romania